The Douglas House is a historic house in rural Benton County, Arkansas. It is a -story vernacular double pen frame house with a side gable roof and a rear wing. Its main facade lacks both windows and doors, which are found on the gable ends and to the rear. It also has a hip-roofed porch supported by turned columns. The house was built c. 1890, and is a little-altered example of this once-common regional form.

The house was listed on the National Register of Historic Places in 1988.

See also
National Register of Historic Places listings in Benton County, Arkansas

References

Houses on the National Register of Historic Places in Arkansas
Houses completed in 1890
Houses in Benton County, Arkansas
National Register of Historic Places in Benton County, Arkansas
1890 establishments in Arkansas
Double pen architecture in the United States